The Roman Catholic Diocese of Muzaffarpur is a diocese located in the city of Muzaffarpur in the Ecclesiastical province of Patna in India.

History
 March 6, 1980: Established as Diocese of Muzaffarpur from the Diocese of Patna.

Leadership
 Bishops of Muzaffarpur (Latin Rite)
 Bishop John Baptist Thakur, S.J. (March 6, 1980 – present)

References

External links
 GCatholic.org 
 Catholic Hierarchy 

Roman Catholic dioceses in India
Christian organizations established in 1980
Roman Catholic dioceses and prelatures established in the 20th century
Christianity in Bihar
1980 establishments in Bihar
Muzaffarpur